Gerald Murnane (born 25 February 1939) is an Australian writer, perhaps best known for his novel The Plains (1982). The New York Times, in a big feature published on 27 March 2018, called him "the greatest living English-language writer most people have never heard of".

Early life 
Murnane was born in Coburg, Victoria, a suburb of Melbourne, and has almost never left the state of Victoria. He is one of four children–one of whom, a brother, suffered an intellectual disability, was repeatedly hospitalised and died in 1985. Parts of his childhood were spent in Bendigo and the Western District. In 1956 he graduated from De La Salle College, Malvern.

Murnane briefly trained for the Roman Catholic priesthood in 1957. He abandoned this path, however, instead becoming a teacher in primary schools (from 1960 to 1968), and at the Victoria Racing Club's Apprentice Jockeys' School. He received a Bachelor of Arts from the University of Melbourne in 1969, then worked in the Victorian Education Department until 1973. From 1980 he began to teach creative writing at various tertiary institutions.

In 1969 Murnane moved to the Melbourne suburb of Macleod. After the death of his wife in 2009 Murnane moved to Goroke in country Victoria.

He married in 1966 and has three sons.

Work 
Murnane's first two books, Tamarisk Row (1974) and A Lifetime on Clouds (1976), seem to be semi-autobiographical accounts of his childhood and adolescence. Both are composed largely of very long but grammatical sentences.

In 1982, he attained his mature style with The Plains, a short novel about an unnamed filmmaker who travels to "inner Australia", where he endeavours to film the plains under the patronage of wealthy landowners. The novel has been termed a fable, parable or allegory. The novel is both a metaphysical parable about appearance and reality, and a parodic examination of traditions and cultural horizons. It has been suggested that the book's opening has the narrator expressing an outlook that is typical to Murnane's writing:Twenty years ago, when I first arrived on the plains, I kept my eyes open. I looked for anything in the landscape that seemed to hint at some elaborate meaning behind appearances.My journey to the plains was much less arduous than I afterwards described it. And I cannot even say that at a certain hour I knew I had left Australia. But I recall clearly a succession of days when the flat land around me seemed more and more a place that only I could interpret.The Plains was followed by Landscape With Landscape (1985), Inland (1988), Velvet Waters (1990), and Emerald Blue (1995). A book of essays, Invisible Yet Enduring Lilacs, appeared in 2005. These books are all concerned with the relation between memory, image, and landscape, and frequently with the relation between fiction and non-fiction.

2009 saw the release of Murnane's first work of fiction in over a decade, Barley Patch, which was followed by A History of Books in 2012 and A Million Windows in 2014. Will Heyward, in a review of A Million Windows for Music & Literature, suggests that these three latter works may be seen as a single, continuous project, containing "a form of fiction defined by a fragmentary style that avoids plot and characterization, and is instead narrated by association and the fugue-like repetition and variation of images."

In June 2018, his 2017 autobiographical novel Border Districts was shortlisted for the Miles Franklin Award.

Although Murnane is primarily known within Australia, he does have a following in other countries, especially the US, Sweden and Germany. In July/August 2017, The Plains was the number 1 book recommendation of South West German Radio (SWR2). His works have been translated into Italian (Velvet Waters as Una Melodia), German (The Plains as Die Ebenen, Border Districts as Grenzbezirke, Landscape With Landscape as Landschaft mit Landschaft, all publ. Suhrkamp Verlag), Spanish (The Plains as Las llanuras, and Something for the Pain as Una vida en las carreras, all published by Editorial Minúscula), Catalan (The Plains as Les planes, also published by Editorial Minúscula), and Swedish (Inland as Inlandet, The Plains as Slätterna, Velvet Waters as Sammetsvatten and Barley Patch as Korntäppa).

Tamarisk Row and Border Districts were published in the UK by And Other Stories in 2019.

Personal life and interests 
Murnane is an avid follower of horse racing, which often serves as a metaphor in his work. A documentary, Words and Silk – The Real and Imaginary Worlds of Gerald Murnane (1989), directed by Philip Tyndall, examined Murnane's childhood, work, approach to the craft of writing, and interest in horse racing. Since his retirement to the town of Goroke, Murnane has enjoyed playing golf.

He taught himself Hungarian after having read Gyula Illyés' People of the Puszta, as described in the essay "The Angel's Son: Why I Learned Hungarian Late in Life":I have read several times during my life that this or that person was so impressed by this or that translation of this or that work of literature that the person afterwards learned the original language in order to read the original text. I have always been suspicious of this sort of claim, but, the reader of this piece of writing need not doubt the truth of the following sentence. I was so impressed by the English version of Puszták népe that I afterwards learned the language of the original and, as of now, have read a goodly part of it.

In June 2018 Murnane released a spoken word album, Words in Order. The centrepiece is a 1600-word palindrome written by Murnane, which he recites over a minimalist musical score. He also performs works by Thomas Hardy, Dezső Kosztolányi, DEVO and Killdozer.

Awards 
The Patrick White Award (1999).
A Special Award in the New South Wales Premier's Literary Awards (2007).
The Australia Council emeritus award (2008).
The Melbourne Prize for Literature (2009)
The Adelaide Festival Awards for Literature 2010 Award for Innovation in Writing
A Million Windows short-listed for the New South Wales Premier's Literary Awards Christina Stead Award for Fiction (2015)
Victorian Premier's Literary Award for Non-Fiction, 2016
Prime Minister's Literary Awards for Fiction, for Border Districts, 2018.
NSW Premier's Literary Awards, shortlisted: Christina Stead Prize for Fiction for Border Districts, 2019

Bibliography

Novels
(1974) Tamarisk Row. William Heinemann Australia, Melbourne.
(1976) A Lifetime on Clouds. William Heinemann Australia, Melbourne.
(1982) The Plains. Norstrilia Press, Melbourne.
(1988) Inland. William Heinemann Australia, Melbourne.
(1995) Emerald Blue. McPhee Gribble, Melbourne.
(2009) Barley Patch. Giramondo Publishing Company, Sydney.
(2012) A History of Books. Giramondo Publishing Company, Sydney.
(2014) A Million Windows. Giramondo Publishing Company, Sydney.
(2017) Border Districts. Giramondo Publishing Company, Sydney.
(2019) A Season on Earth. Text Publishing, Melbourne. Unabridged edition of A Lifetime on Clouds

Short story collections
(1985) Landscape with Landscape. Norstrilia Press, Melbourne.
(1990) Velvet Waters. McPhee Gribble, Melbourne.
(2018) Collected Short Fiction. Giramondo Publishing Company, Sydney.

Essay collection
(2005) Invisible Yet Enduring Lilacs. Giramondo Publishing Company, Sydney.
(2021) Last Letter to a Reader. Giramondo Publishing Company, Sydney.

Poetry collection
(2019) Green Shadows and Other Poems. Giramondo Publishing Company, Sydney.

Memoir
(2015) Something for the Pain: A Memoir of the Turf. Text Publishing, Melbourne.

References

External links 
Reading Gerald Murnane, at CONTEXT
Is the Next Nobel Laureate in Literature Tending Bar in a Dusty Australian Town?, profile, 27 March 2018
A lifetime journey into the geographies of the soul, interview, 14 November 2009.
A world of his own, interview, 3 October 2009.
The literary life of Gerald Murnane, 18 February 2008.
A detrimental education, 30 June 2007.
Speech at Monash University , 27 July 2006.
An obsessive imagination, interview, 15 October 2005.
When the mice failed to arrive, story.
2009 ABC interview about Murnane's Barley Patch.
Biography at Golvan Arts website, Murnane's literary agent.
Words in Order, album.

1939 births
Living people
20th-century Australian novelists
21st-century Australian novelists
Australian essayists
Male essayists
Australian male novelists
Australian male short story writers
Patrick White Award winners
Writers from Melbourne
20th-century Australian short story writers
21st-century Australian short story writers
20th-century essayists
21st-century essayists
20th-century Australian male writers
21st-century Australian male writers
People from Coburg, Victoria